Presidente Epitácio is a municipality in the state of São Paulo in Brazil. The town is named after Epitácio Pessoa. The population is 44,389 (2020 est.) in an area of 1260 km2. The elevation is 310 m. It is situated on the Paraná River, which forms the border with Mato Grosso do Sul here.

The municipality contains the  Lagoa São Paulo Reserve.
It contains part of the  Great Pontal Reserve, created in 1942.
It also contains 11% of the  Mico Leão Preto Ecological Station, established in 2002.

References

External links 
 Official page from Presidente Epitácio